There are many natural caves in Azerbaijan. Most of these caves are karstic caves and the remainder are volcanic caves (lava tubes). These caves were also the first shelters and dwellings of Stone Age hominids and humans.

Azykh Cave, one of the most famous caves of Azerbaijan, is known as the settlement of Stone Age hominids. It was determined that the cave was the settlement of the Acheulean and the Mousterian cultures. During the period of the Mousterian culture, Neanderthals lived in Azykh Cave.

List of caves in Azerbaijan 
The list does not include all caves.

List of cave complexes in Azerbaijan 
The list does not include all cave complexes.

Gallery

See also 
 Geology of Azerbaijan
 Orography of Azerbaijan
 Stone Age in Azerbaijan

References 

 
Azerbaijan
Caves